Makhdoomzada Muhammad Zain Hussain Qureshiis a Pakistani politician who has been a member of the National Assembly of Pakistan since August 2018 to April 2022. He was also a Member of the Provincial Assembly of the Punjab from July 2022 to January 2023.

Political career
Qureshi was elected to the National Assembly of Pakistan from Constituency NA-157 (Multan-IV) as a candidate of Pakistan Tehreek-e-Insaf (PTI) in 2018 Pakistani general election.

On 27 September 2018, Prime Minister Imran Khan appointed him as Federal Parliamentary Secretary for Finance. He served till 10 April 2022, when he resigned from the assembly alongside other PTI members.

He was elected to the Provincial Assmebly of Punjab from Constituency PP-217 (Multan-VII) as a candidate of PTI in the 2022 Punjab provincial by-election. He took oath on 18 July 2022.

Professional career
In 2009, Qureshi interned as a legislative fellow in the office of U.S. Senator John Kerry. Following his time in the United States, he worked as a relationship manager at MCB Bank from 2009 to 2012.

Personal life
Qureshi is the son of Pakistani foreign minister Shah Mahmood Qureshi.

References

Living people
Pakistani MNAs 2018–2023
Pakistan Tehreek-e-Insaf politicians
Politicians from Multan
Zain
Year of birth missing (living people)
Pakistani expatriates in the United States